Le bal (meaning "The ball") is a 1983 Italian-Franco-Algerian film without dialogue directed by Ettore Scola that represents a fifty-year story of French society by way of a ballroom in France.

Cast
None of the characters is named.
 Étienne Guichard as Le jeune étudiant de province / Le jeune professeur (The young provincial student, the young teacher)
 Régis Bouquet as Le patron de la salle / Le paysan (The owner of the hall, the peasant)
 Chantal Capron as Le mannequin (The model)
 Francesco De Rosa as Toni, le jeune serveur (Toni, the young waiter)
 Arnault LeCarpentier as Le jeune typographe / L'étudiant (The young typist, the student)
 Liliane Delval (Liliane Léotard) as La fille aux cheveux longs / L'alcoolique (The girl with long hair, the alcoholic)
 Martine Chauvin as La jeune fleuriste / L'étudiante (The young florist, the student)
 Danielle Rochard as La livreuse d'une modiste, La refugiée,  (The milliner's deliverywoman, the refugee) 
 Nani Noël as La fille de joie / La jeune juive  / La jeune qui peint ses basses (The prostitute, the young Jewess, the young woman who paints her bass)
 Aziz Arbia as Le jeune ouvrier (The young labourer)
 Marc Berman as L'aristo / Le planqué / Le collaborationiste (The aristocrat, the coward, the collaborationist)
 Geneviève Rey-Penchenat as L'aristo (The aristocrat)
 Michel van Speybroeck as L'homme qui vient de loin / Jean Gabin (The man from far away, Jean Gabin)
 Rossana Di Lorenzo as La dame-pipi (The toilet attendant)
 Michel Toty as L'ouvrier spécialisé (The specialist worker)
 Raymonde Heudeline as L'ouvrière (The worker)
 Jean-Claude Penchenat as La 'croix de feu' (The Croix-de-Feu member, a French proto-fascist group)
 Jean-Francois Perrier as le sacristain amoureux / l'officier allemand (The amorous sacristan, the German officer)
Monica Scattini as La jeune fille myope (The young short-sighted girl)

Release
Le Bal was released in the United States in March 1984.

Reception
Vincent Canby from The New York Times gave the film a very good review, stating: "Because Le Bal is a spectacle, most of the performers, unfortunately, remain anonymous, though their contributions are enormous. The film has been choreographed as much as directed in any conventional sense, but the physical production is outstanding. In the 1936 sequence, Mr Scola and his cinematographer, Ricardo Aronovich miraculously drain virtually all the color from the images to create a look that suggests hand-tinted photographs that have begun to fade. More than anything else, these exemplify the mood of the entire film."

Accolades

See also
 List of submissions to the 56th Academy Awards for Best Foreign Language Film
 List of Algerian submissions for the Academy Award for Best Foreign Language Film

References

External links

1980s musical films
1983 films
Best Film César Award winners
Films whose director won the Best Director César Award
Films directed by Ettore Scola
Films scored by Vladimir Cosma
Films without speech
French musical films
Italian musical films
Algerian musical films
Films with screenplays by Ruggero Maccari
Films with screenplays by Ettore Scola
1980s Italian films
1980s French films